Otto Buchsbaum (May 2, 1920 – August 5, 2000) was born in Vienna, Austria. He went to Brazil in 1939. In 1967, he led, together with his wife, Florence Buchsbaum, the movement "Teatro ao Encontro do Povo" (Theater for the People), whose aim was to offer theater shows to the people, trying to discuss their lives and the world. He founded, in the 1970s, the politico-ecological movement "Resistência Ecológica" (Ecological Resistance) and also ran the newspaper "Abertura Cultural" (Cultural Opening), which was the mainstay of the movement.

1920 births
2000 deaths
Austrian emigrants to Brazil